The Federal Correctional Institution, Hazelton (FCI Hazelton) is a medium-security United States federal prison for male inmates, as well as a secure facility for female inmates, located in unincorporated Preston County, West Virginia. It is the newest facility in the federal prison system and is operated by the Federal Bureau of Prisons, a division of the United States Department of Justice. The New York Times notes that its nickname is "Misery Mountain".

The Federal Correctional Complex (FCC) Hazelton has two prisons, physically adjacent but distinct:  FCI Hazelton and the high-security United States Penitentiary, Hazelton constructed in 2004.  Both are operated by the FBOP.

Facility details
FCI Hazelton has a Special Housing Unit where inmates are generally allowed out of their cells only for an hour recreation each weekday as well as for medical appointments. Inmates may be sent to the SHU pending investigations, as punishment for rule violations, for protection from other inmates, or for other administrative reasons.

The facility has a Vocational Training Program, which includes building trades such as Carpentry, Dry Wall, Electrical, HVAC, Masonry, Plumbing, and Welding, Culinary Arts, Graphic Arts, and Microsoft Office.

Notable inmates

See also
List of U.S. federal prisons
Federal Bureau of Prisons
Incarceration in the United States

References

External links
 official web site
"Hazelton Federal Correctional Institution." Moseley Architects.

Federal Correctional Institutions in the United States
Prisons in West Virginia
Buildings and structures in Preston County, West Virginia
2015 establishments in West Virginia